Maxim Ivanov (born May 23, 1987, Berezovka, Khabarovsky District, Khabarovsk Krai) is a Russian political figure and a deputy of the 8th State Duma. 

In 2010, Maxim Ivanov joined the United Russia. On September 14, 2014, he was elected deputy of the Khabarovsk City Duma of the 6th convocation. In 2019, he was appointed acting secretary of the Khabarovsk branch of the United Russia; in June 2021, he was elected as a secretary. He left the post in September 2021 when he was elected deputy of the 8th State Duma.

He is one of the members of the State Duma the United States Treasury sanctioned on 24 March 2022 in response to the 2022 Russian invasion of Ukraine.

References

1987 births
Living people
United Russia politicians
21st-century Russian politicians
Eighth convocation members of the State Duma (Russian Federation)
Russian individuals subject to the U.S. Department of the Treasury sanctions
Russian Presidential Academy of National Economy and Public Administration alumni